Malini may refer to:

People
Max Malini (1873–1942), magician
Malini Awasthi, Indian folk singer
Malini Fonseka (born 1947), Sri Lankan actress
Malini Gaud, Indian politician
Princess Malini Nobhadara (1885–1924) of Thailand
Malini Rajurkar (born 1941), Hindustani singer
Malini Sharma, Indian model and actress
Malini (Tamil actress), South Indian actress

Places
Mălini, commune in Suceava County, Romania
Malini, Bulgaria, a village in Gabrovo Province, Bulgaria
Malinipuri or Malini, a city gifted to Karna by Jarasandha

In mythology
Malini, an elephant-headed goddess associated with the birth of Ganesha
Malini or Mālinī, a mythological river where the baby Shakuntala was left by her mother
Malini, another name for Draupadi, wife of Pandavas

See also
Maline (disambiguation)